Carpentras Cathedral (Cathédrale Saint-Siffrein de Carpentras) is a Roman Catholic church and former cathedral in Carpentras, Provence, France.

The church was built in the 15th century by the order of Benedict XIII. The site used to be a Roman cathedral. Construction started in 1409 and continued for 150 years, with seven different architects working on the building. The main entrance was built in 1512–1514, then modified a hundred years later, and then modified again in 2000–2002. The tower was built in the early 20th century. The cathedral building is a national monument of France.

Until the 19th century Carpentras Cathedral was the seat of the bishops of Carpentras, to one of whom, Saint Siffredus, it is dedicated. However, the diocese was abolished in the Concordat of 1801 and added to the Diocese of Avignon; the cathedral became a church.

Nicolas Saboly, a Provençal poet and composer, served as maître de chapelle of the cathedral in 1639–1643. Louis Archimbaud served as organist of the cathedral from 1727 to 1789.

Notes

External links

 Carpentras Cathedral photographs and information at the official website of Carpentras
 Satellite map of Carpentras with the Cathedral's location

Former cathedrals in France
Churches in Vaucluse
Sites of papal elections
Carpentras